Sôber is an alternative rock band from Madrid, Spain, formed in 1994. Founded when Carlos Escobedo posted an advertisement in a local guitar store and was then contacted by Antonio Bernardini to start Sober Stoned. The band's line-up has primarily consisted of vocalist/bassist Carlos Escobedo, guitarists Jorge Escobedo and Antonio Bernardini, while going through a number of drummers. In 2002, with Alberto Madrid as drummer, the band released Paradÿsso. The album sold more than 100,000 copies. In 2004 they released Reddo, which sold more than 50,000 copies.

On 1 January 2010, the band announced their reunion with Manu Reyes as drummer.

History

Early years 
Sôber is a band from Madrid, Spain, formed in 1994. Founded when Carlos Escobedo posted an advertisement in a local guitar store and was then contacted by Antonio Bernardini to start Sober Stoned. The band's first line-up consisted of the Escobedo brothers, Carlos and Jorge, vocals/bass and guitar, respectively. Antonio Bernardini, also guitar, and Elías Romero as the drummer. Since then the band has had a couple of drummer changes. Sôber takes its name from the literal meaning of sober, and from the song "Sober" by the band Tool, from their first album, Undertow

Torcidos 

They began singing in English and in 1994 they recorded their first demo, titled Mirror’s Way, which included 5 songs. Shortly after, the band signed with their first label. The label forced them to switch from English to Spanish in the process. In 1995, ready to release their first studio album, Torcidos, the record company went bankrupt. Later in 1997, under their own label, Sober Records, they finally released Torcidos.

Morfología 
The band continued working on new songs, and one of them, "La Prisión del Placer", was included in a compilation for the magazine Heavy Rock. The band started to get many calls and letters and they decided to start recording again. They ended up in Rocksoul Studios, with production done by themselves and Alberto Seara. They recorded 3 songs and send the samples to many record companies. Zero Records signed them in 1998. The band changed its name from Sober Stoned to Sôber and Luis Miguel Planelló replaced Elías Romero as drummer. Towards the end of September, they released an EP titled Condenado. In 1999, they released their second studio album, Morfología, which included songs like "Abstinencia", "Loco", "Predicador" and "La Prisión del Placer". After the recording of the album, Alberto Madrid replaced Luis Miguel Planelló as drummer.

Synthesis 
In the year 2000 they released the EP Oxígeno (Ô₂), which contained songs that would later be included in their third studio album, titled Synthesis. It was produced by Oscar Clavel and recorded at Kirios and Eurosonic studios. Some of the songs include "Versus (Vs.)", "Si Me Marcho" and "Vacío".
Synthesis is one of the best Pop rock albums of Spain and sold more than 30,000 copies. Shortly after, the band left Zero Records and signed with Muxxic (Gran Vía Musical).

Paradÿsso 

Sôber began to become known among the rock scene and played alongside bands like Deftones, HIM, and Dover.  They became the revelation group after their performance in a well-known rock festival, Festimad.  In 2002, after an intense tour, they released their fourth studio album, Paradÿsso.  Songs like "Diez Años" and "Paradysso"  rapidly become hit songs in Spain. The album was recorded in Cube Studios by Alberto Seara and was self-produced entirely by the band, giving them the opportunity to develop their own personal ideas. The album has been the band's best, and was certified Gold and Platinum for selling more than 100,000 copies. They set off on a 2-year tour performing over 100 concerts.

Reddo 
After releasing Backstage 02/03, which included 3 songs from their concert in Salamanca in 2003, the band released their fifth studio album, Reddo, which translates into "reflection" in Latin. It was again recorded and self-produced by the band in Cube Studios. It was mixed in Los Angeles by Scott Humphrey, who has worked with artists and bands like Bon Jovi and Metallica, among many others. The album went on sale in February 2004. The lyrics and the majority of the songs were composed by vocalist and bassist, Carlos Escobedo.

Separation in 2005 

After more than ten years of working together, the band decided to separate for some time and take on other projects, with two new groups: Savia, (Carlos Escobedo's project with the collaboration of Alberto Madrid) and Skizoo (formed by Sôber's two guitarists, Antonio Bernandini and Jorge Escobedo).  On 31 October 2005, Universal released a compilation of their greatest hits, titled Grandes Éxitos 1994–2004.

Death of Alberto Madrid 
On 30 November 2006, Alberto Madrid was involved in a fatal traffic accident along the M-40 road in Madrid, Spain.

Return in 2010 
After almost six years working on side projects, on 1 January 2010, the band officially announced on their website their return and the addition of Manu Reyes as drummer. The band also confirmed a tour in Spain, Mexico, Venezuela, Costa Rica, Argentina, and Chile.

Band members 

 Carlos Escobedo – Vocals / Bass
 Jorge Escobedo – Guitar
 Antonio Bernardini – Guitar
 Manu Reyes – Drums

Former members 
 Elías Romero -Drums (1994–1998)
 Luis Miguel Planelló – Drums (1998–1999)
 Alberto Madrid (deceased) – Drums (1999–2005)

Discography

Albums

Singles / videos

Appearance in movies and video games 
The songs "Versus (Vs.)" and "Esfera", from the album "Synthesis", are part of the soundtrack for the Spanish film "School Killer" (2001).
The song "Paradÿsso", from the album of the same name, is part of the soundtrack for the Spanish film "Cosa de brujas" (2003).
The song "Cientos de preguntas", from the album "Reddo", is part of the soundtrack for the FIFA 2005 video game.

References

External links 
 SôberWeb: Official website

Spanish alternative metal musical groups
Musical groups disestablished in 2005
Musical groups established in 1994
Musical groups reestablished in 2010
Musical groups from Madrid
Spanish alternative rock groups
Spanish heavy metal musical groups
Rock en Español music groups